Kiowa is a ghost town in Thayer County, Nebraska, United States.

History
A post office was established at Kiowa in 1873, and remained in operation until it was discontinued in 1903. The community was named after the Kiowa Indians.

References

Geography of Thayer County, Nebraska